Ternstroemia calycina is a species of flowering plant in the family Pentaphylacaceae. It is endemic to Jamaica, where it is known only from Cockpit Country. It is considered endangered.

References

calycina
Endemic flora of Jamaica
Endangered plants
Taxonomy articles created by Polbot